Oahu Forest National Wildlife Refuge was established in 2000 to protect fish, wildlife, and plants which are listed as threatened or endangered species.

Landscape
The Refuge is located on the upper slopes of the northern Koʻolau Range, on the island of O'ahu.

Natural resources
O'ahu Forest National Wildlife Refuge is home to at least four species of endangered pupu kani oe (O'ahu tree snails), 15 endangered plant species, and many native birds, including the O'ahu 'elepaio, 'i'iwi, pueo, and native honeycreepers.

Public use
The Refuge is closed to the public.

Notes

References

National Wildlife Refuges in Hawaii
Protected areas of Oahu
Protected areas established in 2000
Forests of Hawaii
2000 establishments in Hawaii